Kweku Aacht, known by his stage name Awotwi, is a British Ghanaian singer-songwriter, composer, musician and dancer. He is known as a vocalist in his collaborations with experimental electronic artistes and for creating cutting edge dance theatre soundtracks and performances.

Music and performance career 
Aacht was influenced in the early 1990s by his time spent on the UK's underground club scene, at outdoor raves and music festivals. During this era, Aacht soaked up the eclectic sounds of the UK underground. He encountered artistes such as the Prodigy, Darren Emerson, Björk and Tricky. Aacht began his dance career by the mid 90s as a commercial dancer. He danced in TV advertisements as well as performing in nightclubs such as Deep Funk at Madame JoJo's and The Ministry of Sound.

In 1999, Aacht began his work as recording artist, when he co-wrote and performed on two songs on Zan Lyons debut album Desolate and was also featured on Damian Lazarus' Mind Horizon Records compilation Different Noise.

While studying at London College of Fashion, Aacht moved to Hackney, the center of London's vibrant art scene.  Here he socialised and collaborated with a range of fine artists from the movement dubbed the Y.B.As (Young British Artists) by the press, creating sound installations and performing music in art spaces and galleries. In 2004 he collaborated with electronica artist Leila Arab in her performance at the V&A museum which was later featured on her album Blood Looms and Blooms.

In 2002, Aacht's dance career came to a crashing halt when he experienced a serious muscular skeletal injury. He was unable to dance for over three years. During this period, he focused on one of his other passions social development, leading on art-based programs, designed and to support the growth, empowerment and transformation of young people and of disadvantaged communities. His work with leading some of the UKs leading community development specialists includes co-designing a national program tackling conflict in community tension areas for The Tutu Foundation UK.

2006 marked Aacht's return to making music. Aacht attended a dance performance at East London's Stratford Circus featuring a performance from now leading contemporary dance company C-12 Dance Theatre. A meeting with C-12 following the performance led to a long-term collaborative relationship and sparked the beginning of his career as composer and musical director for innovative dance theatre productions.
Two years later, Aacht himself returned to the stage performing in a series of self-choreographed pieces re-igniting his dance career. Over the next five years Aacht developed his hybrid of music production and dance performance, gaining popularity within the UKs hip-hop and contemporary dance communities. 
In 2013 Aacht moved to Ghana.

Kindred Tribe

In 2012, Aacht embarked on is first music performance project since mid 2000s. He joined forces with leading African Contemporary dance artist and Vocab Dance Company director Alesandra Seutin and dancer/actress and singer Nandi Bhebhe. Together they formed the dance collective produced by Aacht drawing upon the trio's eclectic influences to create a dynamic and unique dance act. Kindred Tribe wrote a number of songs and traveled to Ghana to perform at the Asa Baako festival.

Productions

References

External links
 

Year of birth missing (living people)
Living people
English people of Ghanaian descent
English electronic musicians
English male singer-songwriters
English record producers
English male composers
English male dancers